Bossa Studios Limited is a British video game developer based in London. It is known for its comedic, physics-based games Surgeon Simulator and I Am Bread.

History 

Bossa was founded in October 2010 by Henrique Olifiers (gamer-in-chief), Roberta Lucca (marketer-in-chief), Ric Moore (technologist-in-chief), and Imre Jele (creator-in-chief). The establishment was formally announced in June 2011, when it had opened its office at the Silicon Roundabout in London, England. Bossa was acquired by the television production company Shine Group in 2011, with the deal announced on 16 September, without disclosing terms. At the time, Bossa had 20 employees, and its first game, Monstermind, launched that same month for the Facebook Platform. Monstermind won the BAFTA award in the "Online – Browser" category in February 2012.

Subsequent games by Bossa were Toy Run and Merlin: The Game, the latter based on the Shine-produced TV series Merlin. Following the commercial success of Surgeon Simulator, Bossa underwent a management buyout process in July 2015 that returned Shine's stake (transferred to Endemol Shine UK after Shine merged with Endemol in December 2014) to the studio's founders.

The company received a  investment in a series A round in September 2017. Shortly thereafter, they hired former Valve writer Chet Faliszek to lead a new Seattle-based studio for them, working on an unannounced cooperative title.

In August 2022 some of Bossa Studios IPs including Surgeon Simulator, I Am Bread, and I am Fish was sold to TinyBuild for a reported $3 million.

Games

Games developed

Games published

Cancelled 
 Decksplash
 Worlds Adrift

References

External links 
 

2010 establishments in England
British companies established in 2010
Privately held companies based in London
Video game companies established in 2010
Video game companies of the United Kingdom
Video game development companies
2011 mergers and acquisitions